The 1955–56 WHL season was the fourth season of the Western Hockey League. The Winnipeg Warriors were the President's Cup champions as they beat the Vancouver Canucks in six games in the final series.

Three new teams joined the league: the Seattle Totems, Winnipeg Warriors, and Regina Regals. However due to low attendance the Regals moved to Brandon, Manitoba after 11 games and finished the season there.

Final standings 

bold - qualified for playoffs

Playoffs 
The Winnipeg Warriors win the President's Cup 4 games to 2.

References

Bibliography

 

Western Hockey League (1952–1974) seasons
1955–56 in American ice hockey by league
1955–56 in Canadian ice hockey by league